Rossiyanka may refer to:

 Rossiyanka, female citizen of Russia, regardless of ethnicity
 WFC Rossiyanka, Russian women's football
 ROSSIYANKA, Russian Reusable launch system

See also 
 Rossiyanin, male citizen of Russia, regardless of ethnicity
 Russian (disambiguation)